The Gananoque Islanders are a Canadian Senior team based out of Gananoque, Ontario. They play in the Eastern Ontario Super Hockey League. 

They were members of the Junior C Provincial Junior Hockey League from 2016-2019. For the 15/16 season they played in the Empire B Junior C Hockey League, but were members of the Eastern Ontario Junior Hockey League a Junior B hockey league from 1986 until 2015.

History
The G-Men started out in the EOJHL in 1972. In 1977, they opted to move to the Ontario Hockey Association's Quinte-St. Lawrence Junior C Hockey League. In 1986, the league merged with the Central Junior C Hockey League and the G-Men returned to the EOJHL. They changed their name to the Platers that year and then the Islanders in 1993.

At the conclusion of the 2014-15 season, the league announced it was re-organizing to be more of a dedicated developmental league to the Central Canada Hockey League and renamed the league Central Canada Hockey League Tier 2. Initially,  the league was to downsize to twelve teams (one feeder club for each Tier 1 team), however it reduced to six teams, removing six of the current franchises, including the Akwesasne Wolves, Morrisburg Lions, Almonte Thunder, Gananoque Islanders, Gatineau Mustangs and Shawville Pontiacs.

The Gananoque Islanders announced that they would continue their franchise in the Empire B Junior C Hockey League beginning in 2015-16. For the 2016/17 season the Empire B league combined with seven other Southern Ontario leagues to become the Provincial Junior Hockey League. The members of the Empire league became the Tod Division in the East Conference of the PJHL.

In 2021 they became part of the EOSHL.

Notable alumni
Andy Sutton - Current Edmonton Oilers defenceman.
Erik Cole - Current Dallas Stars - 
Hunter Drew - Current San Diego Gulls (AHL) Defenceman 
Randy Payne - Dedicated Soldier killed in Afghanistan April 22, 2006

Season-by-season results

References

External links

Empire B Jr. C website

Eastern Ontario Junior B Hockey League teams
Ice hockey clubs established in 1972
1972 establishments in Ontario